Sherwood railway station (officially Sherwood Station and previously known as Kingsley Station) is a suburban railway station in Armadale, a suburb of Perth, Western Australia. The station opened in 1973 as Kingsley, but was renamed to Sherwood in 1993. It consists of two side platforms with a pedestrian level crossing. It is not fully accessible due to steep ramps, wide gaps at the pedestrian level crossing, and wide gaps between the platform and train. Services are operated by Transperth Train Operations, a division of the state government's Public Transport Authority. Peak services reach seven trains per hour in each direction, whilst off-peak services are four trains per hour.

Description
Sherwood station is along the South Western Railway, which links Perth to Bunbury. The northern  of this railway, between Perth and Armadale, is used by Armadale line suburban rail services as part of the Transperth network. The line and the station are owned by the Public Transport Authority (PTA), an agency of the Government of Western Australia. Sherwood station is located between Challis station to the north and Armadale station to the south, within the suburb of Armadale. This places the station in Transperth fare zone three.

The only way to cross the tracks is at a pedestrian level crossing at the southern end of the station. There is a car park on both sides of the station, with a total of 47 bays.

History
With the 1970 Corridor Plan for Perth, new areas between Armadale and Kelmscott were opened up for development. The Armadale–Kelmscott Shire Council began lobbying the state government for new stations within the large gap between Armadale and Kelmscott stations. Plans were completed by May 1973 for two new stations, with construction commencing soon afterwards. Sherwood station opened later that year, as did the adjacent Challis station. Sherwood was originally named Kingsley station after the nearby Kingsley Primary School. It was renamed on 27 July 1989 to avoid confusion with Kingsley in the northern suburbs of Perth. The name "Sherwood" comes from a nearby housing estate developed in the early 20th century. In 1982–83, shelters were built at the station.

Services
Sherwood station is served by Armadale line services operated by Transperth Train Operations, a division of the PTA. The line goes between Perth station and Armadale station. Armadale line services reach seven trains per hour during peak, dropping to four trains per hour between peaks. At night, there are two trains per hour, dropping to one train per hour in the early hours of the morning. Apart from at night and on Sundays/public holidays, most train services follow the "C" stopping pattern, which skips Burswood, Victoria Park, Carlisle, Welshpool and Queens Park stations. There are also two "B" stopping pattern services which run during the afternoon Armadale-bound. Those services are the same as the "C" pattern except they stop at Queens Park. Starting at night, trains stop at all stations. On Sundays and public holidays, half of all trains are "C" pattern trains and half are all stops trains.

On Railway Avenue is a pair of bus stops for route 907, the rail replacement bus service.

In the 2013–14 financial year, Sherwood station had 136,158 boardings. The City of Armadale rezoned nearby land for higher densities in the late 2010s, with the goal of increasing patronage.

Notes

References

External links

Armadale, Western Australia
Armadale and Thornlie lines
Railway stations in Perth, Western Australia
Railway stations in Australia opened in 1973